Slum clearance, slum eviction or slum removal is an urban renewal strategy used to transform low income settlements with poor reputation into another type of development or housing. This has long been a strategy for redeveloping urban communities; for example slum clearance plans were required in the United Kingdom in the Housing Act 1930, while the Housing Act of 1937 encouraged similar clearance strategies in the United States. Frequently, but not always, these programs were paired with public housing or other assistance programs for the displaced communities.

Reasons
Slum clearance is still practiced today in a number of different situations. During major international events like conferences and sporting competitions, governments have been known to forcefully clear low income housing areas, as a strategy to impress the international attention in an attempt to reduce the visibility of the host city's apparent poverty. Other attempts at slum clearance have been subject to other motivations, such as repressing political opposition or attempts to keep certain communities in check. Zimbabwe's Operation Murambatsvina was widely criticized by the international community, including a scathing report from the UN which noted human rights abuses alongside poor design of the program, which was estimated to displace at least 700,000 slum dwellers.

Consequences
Critics argue that slum removal by force tends to ignore the social problems that cause slums. Poor families who may fall below the income threshold to afford low income housing replacements, often families including children and working adults, need a place to live when adequate low income housing is too expensive to provide housing. Moreover, slums are frequently sites of informal economies that provide jobs, services, and livelihoods not otherwise available in the community. Slum clearance removes the slum, but it does not remove the causes that create and maintain the slum. Similarly, plans to remove slums in a number of non-Western contexts have proven ineffective without sufficient housing and other support for the displaced communities; for example academics describing such strategies as detrimental in Nigeria, where the slum destruction puts further stress on already short housing stock, in some cases create new slums in other parts of the community.

Alternatives
Some communities have opted for slum upgrading, as an alternative solution: improving the quality of services and infrastructure to match the community developed in the slum.

See also
 Slum clearance in India
 Slum clearance in the United Kingdom
 Slum clearance in the United States
 Slum clearance in South Africa

References 

 
Squatting